On the Silver Globe may refer to:

On the Silver Globe (novel), first volume of the Polish science fiction epic Lunar Trilogy by Jerzy Żuławski
On the Silver Globe (film), Polish film based on the novel, directed in 1988 by Andrzej Żuławski